Amilaps is a monotypic genus of jumping spiders containing the single species, Amilaps mayana. It was first described in 2019 by Wayne Maddison, who originally collected the type specimen in 1983 in Teapa, Mexico. The genus was tentatively placed in the tribe Lapsiini, a division of the subfamily Spartaeinae.

See also
 List of Salticidae genera

References

Monotypic Salticidae genera
Spiders of Mexico
Spiders of Central America